Bullwinkle or Bullwinkel may refer to:

 Bullwinkle J. Moose, a character in the television shows Rocky and His Friends and The Bullwinkle Show
 Captain Horatio Bullwinkle, Tugboat Annie's antagonist in films and a TV series
 Vivian Bullwinkel (1915–2000), Australian Army nurse and lieutenant colonel, survivor of a Japanese World War II massacre
 Bullwinkel or Bullwinkle, former name of Crannell, California, a former settlement
 Bullwinkle (oil platform), in the Gulf of Mexico
 Bullwinkle's Restaurant, a chain of family entertainment centers